Jan Norbert Żniniewicz (1 December 1872 in Ostrów Wielkopolski – 25 July 1952 in Poznań) was a Polish balneologist, pioneer of modern hydrotherapy in Poland.

He introduced new methods in a hydrotherapy treatment. He founded hydrotherapy institute in Poznań.

Notable publications
 Hartowanie ciała i leczenie wodą w świetle fizjologii
 Wodolecznictwo a nerwy

References
 

1872 births
1952 deaths
20th-century Polish physicians
People from Ostrów Wielkopolski
Hydrotherapists